The Cherry Orchard is a 1981 British TV drama film directed by Richard Eyre based on the eponymous play by Anton Chekhov.

Cast 
 Judi Dench - Mme. Ranevsky
 Bill Paterson - Lopakhin
 Anton Lesser - Trofimov
 Harriet Walter - Varya
 Suzanne Burden - Anya
 Frederick Treves - Gayev
 Timothy Spall - Epikhodov
 Frances Low - Dunyasha
 David Rintoul - Yasha
 Anna Massey - Charlotte

References

External links 

1981 drama films
1981 films
1980s English-language films
1980s British films
British drama television films